Dead Indian Creek is a tributary of South Fork Little Butte Creek in Jackson County, in the U.S. state of Oregon. It flows generally north through the Rogue River – Siskiyou National Forest in the Cascade Range east of Medford. The South Fork flows northwest to meet the North Fork near Lake Creek; combined they form Little Butte Creek, a tributary of the Rogue River.

Dead Indian Creek was so named in the 1850s when two Tututni died near its banks. According to Oregon Geographic Names, Dead Indian Mountain and Dead Indian Memorial Road are also named after the same incident in which two settlers found two dead Native Americans in deserted dwellings near the creek. The road, originally named "Dead Indian Road" but renamed to avoid being interpreted as denigrating, eventually extended from Ashland, past the mountain and the creek to Upper Klamath Lake.

See also
 Dead Indian Soda Springs

References

Rivers of Jackson County, Oregon
Rivers of Oregon